Spongiimonas is a Gram-negative and strictly aerobic genus of bacteria from the family of Weeksellaceae with one known species (Spongiimonas flava). Spongiimonas flava has been isolated from a marine sponge.

References

Flavobacteria
Bacteria genera
Taxa described in 2014
Monotypic bacteria genera